Joaquín Pérez Ibáñez (born 1 February 2000) is an Argentine footballer who plays as a forward, most recently for Al Wasl.

Club career
Born in Buenos Aires, Pérez started his career with River Plate. In 2017, he expressed his admiration for English Premier League side Liverpool, stating that he liked their style of play and manager, Jürgen Klopp. He also cited Zlatan Ibrahimović as a player he looked up to, and wanted to emulate. The following year he trialled with Italian sides Bologna and Lazio, going close to signing with the latter.

Despite the interest from Italian clubs, he would sign for fellow Argentinian side Defensa y Justicia in 2019. However, after failing to break into the first team, he moved to the United Arab Emirates, joining Al Wasl.

Career statistics

Club

Notes

References

2000 births
Living people
Footballers from Buenos Aires
Argentine footballers
Association football forwards
UAE Pro League players
Club Atlético River Plate footballers
Defensa y Justicia footballers
Al-Wasl F.C. players
Argentine expatriate footballers
Argentine expatriate sportspeople in the United Arab Emirates
Expatriate footballers in the United Arab Emirates